Charles S. Amery (16 September 1910 – 1979) was an English footballer who played as a left back. He moved from New Brighton to Tranmere Rovers in 1935, making 47 appearances for Rovers. Amery subsequently made one appearance in the Football League for Stockport County. He also played for Blackpool during his career.

References

New Brighton A.F.C. players
Tranmere Rovers F.C. players
Stockport County F.C. players
1910 births
Blackpool F.C. wartime guest players
1979 deaths
English footballers
People from Wallasey
Association football fullbacks
English Football League players